Lalbandi is a Municipality in Sarlahi District in the Janakpur Zone of Central Development Region of  Nepal. The municipality was established on 18 May 2014 by merging the existing Parwanipur VDC, Netragung vdc, Jabdi, Lalbandi and Pattharkot VDCs. At the time of the 2021 Nepal Census, it had a population of 67,507 living in 13905 individual households. There are 17 wards in this municipality. It is the largest municipality in Sarlahi district. The office of this municipality is in ward no.6 Located in the Lalbandi. Lalbandi Bazar, located on the East West Mahendra highway, is one of the main trading areas within the municipal area. Bordering East Ishwarpur Municipality, West Hariwan and Haripur Municipality, North Sindhuli District and bordering Haripur and Ishwarpur in the south, Lalbandi Bazar is the main trading site of the district.

Due to increasing urbanization, increased business activity, this municipality is becoming a center of attraction in the district and is developing as the largest municipality in the district.

The whole municipality is moving forward unitedly for the prosperity and development of this municipality by embracing the original slogan, "Clean, beautiful and prosperous city, Pride of Sarlahi District." The municipality is committed to the economic and social upliftment of women, indigenous nationalities, Dalits, the disabled within the municipal area.

The place is famous for tomato production in whole Nepal. Tomato and other green vegetables are the chief cash crop of this place along with paddy, wheat, maize and other crops. It is the fast developing Municipality in Mid Terai region of Nepal. Bhudeo Khadya Udhyog (Hulas Foods), a subsidiary of Hulas Group is located here which is one of the biggest rice, pulse and flour manufacturing and packaging industry in Nepal.

Natural Resource 
Lalbandi Municipality is broadly divided into Chure region, Bhabar region and Terai Region. The municipality is situated in subtropical monsoon climatic region so, subtropical vegetation preveals in the region. Sal Forest (Shorea robusta) is dominant forest. Other trees found in the municipality are khayer, Sissou (Dalbergia sissoo), Karma, Kumni, Harro, Barro, Sindure, Tantari, Sanisal, Simal (Bombax ceiba), Bhurkul, Dabdabe, etc. The faunal species found in the region are tiger, leopard, bear, elephant, wild buffalo (Bubalus arnee), wild boar, deer, chital, etc. Peacock, Hornbill, kalij, Luiche, etc. are the bird found in the region. Deforestation, population increment are major cause for destruction of habitat of wildlife. Lakhandehi River flows through this municipality.

Climate 
Harion region has subtropical monsoon type of climate. With the reference to Climatic Station of Janakpur, the average maximum temperature of the municipality is 31° C with record of the highest temperature 42° C while the average minimum temperature of 20° C with record of the minimum temperature 4° C. About 80% of rainfall occurs in monsoon season (July–September) with average rainfall of 1699.6 mm.

Population Status 
With reference to population and housing census 2011, about 59,395 people are residing in Lalbandi Municipality living in 3,295 individual households.

Education 
Community school Janajyoti Multiple campus that can be studied up to postgraduate level, 3 year Diploma Computer Overseas Course in CTEVT and Janjyoti Technical School, which taught 15 months sub-overseas Course. There are 40 community schools in this Municipality.

Source of Drinking water 
Most of household use tubewell/handpump for drinking water while northern people of this municipality use drinking water from uncovered well/kuwa. In some area of this municipality, people use tap/piped water. Some people use drinking water from river/stream as well. Sprout water, covered well/kuwa, etc. are the other source of drinking water.

Use of Energy 
People of Lalbandi Municipality mainly depend upon traditional fuel type for cooking. About minimum percentage of people depend on LP gas for cooking. Biogas is also used for cooking fuel. Other cooking fuel are kerosene, electricity, santhi/Guitha and the others. People of Lalbandi mainly depend on electricity, kerosene, biogas, solar energy for lighting purpose.

Industries/Agriculture 
The place is famous for tomato production in whole Nepal. Tomato and other green vegetables are the chief cash crop of this place along with paddy, wheat, maize and other crops. It is the fast developing VDCs in Mid Terai region of Nepal. Bhudeo Khadya Udhyog (Hulas Foods), a subsidiary of Hulas Group is located here which is one of the biggest rice, pulse and flour manufacturing and packaging industry in Nepal.

Service 
Lalbandi has a permanent market area which houses shops for Garment, Hardware, Cosmetics, Departmental Stores, DVD rentals, Travel agencies, Grocery shops, Hospital, Cooperative Finance companies, a couple of major banks and their ATMs. One can also use internet facilities in the market area. There is a biweekly market that is set up every Monday and Thursday. These are the days when most people from the surrounding areas come for the weekly shopping of groceries. With each passing day the number of shops in the market are growing along with the quality and variety of products that they offer.

Media 
There are two FM radio stations in Lalbandi Municipality i.e. Radio Ekata 92.4 MHz. and Dhukdhuki FM 95.2 MHz. Radio Ekata is Community radio Station and other Dhukdhuki FM is private radio station.

Medical Facility 
In the area of health care, 15 beds government hospital, 100 beds community cooperative hospital and community eye treatment center under construction and health care operated by various associations are available in this municipality.

Temple and River 
The temple of Lord Shiva and the river is famous in nearby areas. People come here from surrounding areas in Maha Shivaratri, Bala Chaturdashi, Saune Sombar Chhath and other festivals.

Transport 
The most important National Highway in Nepal passes through Lalbandi, the EastWest Highway. Due to this most long route buses plying to major hubs in the country like Kathmandu, Pokhara, Birgunj, Biratnagar, Nepalgunj pass through Lalbandi and so one can easily catch a bus to all the major parts of the country from Lalbandi. For local transportation, tempos and Tata ace are popularly used. Nearest airport is the Simara Airport which is approximately 70 km. One can get flights to major destination in Nepal from this airport.

References

External links
UN map of the municipalities of Sarlahi  District

Populated places in Sarlahi District
Municipalities in Madhesh Province
Nepal municipalities established in 2014